Christian Dale Millar (born 23 November 1989), is an English footballer who plays as a midfielder for Newcastle Town.

Football career
Millar started his career in Stoke City's youth academy system playing through from the youngest age bracket to the under 18's side where he failed to gain a YT contract. From there Millar went on several trials and open days to find a club resulting in his signing on with Macclesfield Town. He made his debut in January 2008 against Morecambe coming on as a substitute. In December 2008, Millar went to Stafford Rangers on a one month's loan spell. After impressing in his first month, his loan spell was extended to three months in which Millar was a valued member of the side contributing with two goals.

Millar signed for Buxton in August 2009 after being released by Macclesfield despite being invited back by Stafford for pre-season training.

He then joined Witton Albion before moving to Leek Town in September 2010, and then re-signing again on non-contract terms for the 2011 season.

He left Leek in October 2012 having made 82 appearances scoring six goals. He then moved to Newcastle Town.

References

External links
Millar's Official Macclesfield Profile

Footballers from Stoke-on-Trent
Association football midfielders
English footballers
Macclesfield Town F.C. players
Stafford Rangers F.C. players
Buxton F.C. players
English Football League players
1989 births
Living people
Leek Town F.C. players
Witton Albion F.C. players
Northern Premier League players
Newcastle Town F.C. players